Ruben Darío Rojas Dielma (born January 20, 1960 in Buenos Aires) is a retired Bolivian football goalkeeper. He was part of the Bolivia national football team in the 1994 FIFA World Cup. He has played for Oriente Petrolero, Real Santa Cruz and Guabirá.

References
playerhistory

1961 births
Living people
Bolivian footballers
Association football goalkeepers
Bolivia international footballers
1994 FIFA World Cup players
1993 Copa América players
Oriente Petrolero players
Guabirá players